

Ne 
Nekopi, Nenovići (municipality Ravno), Neum (Herzegovina-Neretva Canton), Nevada (municipality Ravno), Nevorići

No 
Novakovići, Novi Travnik

Lists of settlements in the Federation of Bosnia and Herzegovina (A-Ž)